Kildare is a town in Kay County, Oklahoma, United States. The population was 100 at the 2010 census, an 8.7 percent increase from the figure of 92 in 2000.

History
According to the Encyclopedia of Oklahoma History and Culture, the Atchison, Topeka and Santa Fe Railroad built a section house, agent's cottage, a tool house and a depot at the future site of Kildare in 1892, a year before the opening of the Cherokee Outlet to settlers.

The railroad said it sold eight thousand tickets to Kildare for September 16, 1893, the opening day of the Cherokee Strip land run. Kildare boomed almost overnight. A post office was established on October 24, 1893. The town was incorporated by the Territorial Legislature on March 2, 1905. However, the lack of water limited its future. The highest population ever recorded in the U. S. census was 216 in 1910. Three times fires destroyed the business district, and fewer businesses rebuilt each time.

It was named after County Kildare in Ireland.

Geography

Demographics

As of the census of 2000, there were 92 people, 37 households, and 29 families residing in the town. The population density was 577.2 people per square mile (222.0/km2). There were 41 housing units at an average density of 257.3 per square mile (98.9/km2). The racial makeup of the town was 76.09% White, 13.04% Native American, and 10.87% from two or more races. Hispanic or Latino of any race were 2.17% of the population.

There were 37 households, out of which 35.1% had children under the age of 18 living with them, 51.4% were married couples living together, 24.3% had a female householder with no husband present, and 21.6% were non-families. 18.9% of all households were made up of individuals, and 8.1% had someone living alone who was 65 years of age or older. The average household size was 2.49 and the average family size was 2.79.

In the town, the population was spread out, with 29.3% under the age of 18, 2.2% from 18 to 24, 23.9% from 25 to 44, 31.5% from 45 to 64, and 13.0% who were 65 years of age or older. The median age was 39 years. For every 100 females there were 70.4 males. For every 100 females age 18 and over, there were 66.7 males.

The median income for a household in the town was $16,250, and the median income for a family was $25,313. Males had a median income of $28,750 versus $16,250 for females. The per capita income for the town was $13,798. There were 37.0% of families and 37.3% of the population living below the poverty line, including 44.1% of under eighteens and 16.7% of those over 64.

See also

 List of municipalities in Oklahoma

References

External links

Towns in Kay County, Oklahoma
Towns in Oklahoma